Tobias Hammer Svendsen (born 31 August 1999) is a Norwegian footballer who plays as a midfielder for Eliteserien club Lillestrøm.

He is a younger brother of Sander Svendsen.

Club career
Svendsen made his league debut on 9 July 2016 in a match against Sogndal, which Molde lost 4–3.

Svendsen was loaned out to Sandefjord on 16 January 2019 for the whole season. The loan was terminated in July 2019, and Svendsen returned to Molde. On 9 September 2019, Molde announced that Svendsen would be loaned out to Nest-Sotra for the rest of the 2019 season.

Career statistics

References

External links
Profile at Sandefjord
Profile at NFF

1999 births
Living people
People from Molde
Norwegian footballers
Norway youth international footballers
Norway under-21 international footballers
Association football midfielders
Molde FK players
FK Haugesund players
Sandefjord Fotball players
Nest-Sotra Fotball players
Hamarkameratene players
Lillestrøm SK players
Eliteserien players
Norwegian First Division players
Sportspeople from Møre og Romsdal